The 2011–12 Maryland Terrapins men's basketball team represented the University of Maryland in the 2011–12 college basketball season as a member of the Atlantic Coast Conference (ACC). The team was led by first-year head coach Mark Turgeon, previously head coach of the Texas A&M Aggies. In March 2011, Turgeon was hired to replace Gary Williams, who retired from the position after 22 years at his alma mater. The Terrapins played their home games on campus at the Comcast Center in College Park, Maryland.

Preseason

Recruiting

Roster

Schedule 

|-
!colspan=12 style="background:#CE1126; color:#FFFFFF;"| Exhibition

|-
!colspan=12 style="background:#CE1126; color:#FFFFFF;"| Regular Season

|-

|-
!colspan=12 style="background:#CE1126; color:#FFFFFF;"| ACC Tournament

References

Maryland Terrapins men's basketball seasons
Maryland Terrapins
Maryland Terrapins men's b
Maryland Terrapins men's b